Leonard Mascot Blumenthal (February 27, 1901 – August 1984) was a Jewish American mathematician.

He received his Ph.D. in 1927 from Johns Hopkins University, under the supervision of Frank Morley; his dissertation was titled Lagrange Resolvents in Euclidean Geometry. He taught for the majority of his professional career at the University of Missouri and was the author of A Modern View of Geometry.

He was a visiting scholar at the Institute for Advanced Study from 1933 to 1936.  According to the Mathematics Genealogy Project, he had 18 Ph.D. students at Missouri, among them Leroy Milton Kelly and William Arthur Kirk; he is the academic ancestor of over 80 mathematicians.

The Leonard M. Blumenthal Distinguished Professorship in Mathematics at the University of Missouri was established in 1992 in honor of Blumenthal. This endowed chair is given on a five-year rotating basis to Missouri mathematics professors; the Blumenthal Professors at Missouri have included John Beem, Mark Ashbaugh, Alex Koldobsky, and Zhenbo Qin.

References

Works
 Blumenthal L.M. Theory and applications of distance geometry (1953), Oxford: At the Clarendon Press (Geoffrey Cumberlege), XI, 347 p. 
 Blumenthal L.M. Theory and applications of distance geometry, (2nd edition, 1970), Bronx, New York: Chelsea Publishing Company. XI, 347 p., 
 Blumenthal L.M. A Modern View of Geometry (1961), W. H. Freeman & Co.; Dover edition (1980)

External links
 

1901 births
1984 deaths
20th-century American mathematicians
Johns Hopkins University alumni
University of Missouri faculty
Institute for Advanced Study visiting scholars
Mathematicians from Missouri